The MV  C Champion is a submarine and special warfare support vessel in the United States Military Sealift Command.
The vessel has been proposed to serve as an anti-piracy escort, where it would be
armed with two fifty-caliber machine guns, and four high-speed pursuit craft.
Special forces carried by the vessel would use the high speed pursuit craft to intercept or chase pirates. In 2011, it rescued a family of five in the Philippine Sea.

References

Auxiliary ships of the United States
1998 ships